Corcoran is an Irish surname, the original Irish language form being  meaning 'descendant of Corcrán'. The name itself is derived from  meaning 'purple'.

History 

The name Corcoran is an anglicisation of the names of two Gaelic clans. The first was the Ó Corcráin in Ulster. The second was the MacCorcráin clan from Leinster, which was a sept of Ó Corcráin.
 	
Related variations of the name Corcoran historically include MacCorcoran, O'Corcoran, and Corcorran. The Corcorans were predominantly from Fermanagh and included a number of figures of historical importance such as the Bishop of Clogher in 1370 and Edmund O'Corcoran, "the hero of Limerick" (from the siege of 1691).
 	
Many Corcorans become members of the clergy between the tenth and fifteenth centuries, they became based around the vicinity of Lough Erne, County Fermanagh in Ulster. One member of the family, John Corcoran was appointed Bishop of Clogher in 1373.

The O'Corcrain territory was invaded by the Normans in 1170 AD.

During the Plantation of Ulster and the Cromwellian conquest of Ireland in 1649 AD, the Corcorans were scattered. Many settled on lands in Connaught, Munster and Leinster. Principally Offaly, Tipperary and Galway where the MacCorcorans had settled previously.

Modern 

Today the surname is used throughout Ireland and throughout the Irish diaspora.

Notable people with the surname Corcoran 

 Ann Corcoran (born 1951), Australian politician
 Annette Corcoran (born 1930), American ceramist 
 Barbara Corcoran (born 1949), real estate mogul, entrepreneur, and investor on ABC's "Shark Tank"
 Brian Ó Corcrán (died 1624?), poet
 Brian Corcoran (born 1973), former Irish sportsman
 Cahalan Ó Corcrán (died 1001), Abbot
 Danny Corcoran (disambiguation), several people
 Des Corcoran (1929–2004), Australian politician
 Donna Corcoran (born 1942), American former child actress
 Éamonn Corcoran (born 1978), former Irish sportsman
 Evan Corcoran (born 1964), American lawyer
 Farrel Corcoran, author and academic
 Felimidh Ó Corcrán (died 1522), Canon lawyer
 Fláithrí Ó Corcrán (died 1496), singer and harpist
 Frank Corcoran (born 1944), Irish composer
 Fred Corcoran (1905–1977), World Golf Hall of Famer
 James Corcoran (1770–1804), Irish rebel
 Jerry Corcoran (1893–1981), American football player and executive
 Jim Corcoran (born 1949), Canadian musician
 Jimmy Corcoran (1819–1900), gangster
 Johannes O Corcoran OSB (died c. 1389), Bishop of Clogher
 John Corcoran (disambiguation), several people
 Kevin Corcoran (1949–2015), American director, producer and former child actor
 Larry Corcoran (1859–1891), American pitcher in Major League Baseball
 Michael Corcoran (1827–1863), American general and close confidant of Abraham Lincoln during the American Civil War
 Niall Corcoran, Irish sportsman
 Noreen Corcoran (1943–2016), American actress
 Ray Corcoran, Australian rugby league footballer
 Thomas E. Corcoran (1838–1904), United States Navy sailor and a recipient of the Medal of Honor
 Thomas Gardiner Corcoran, a member of President Franklin D. Roosevelt's brain trust
 Timothy Corcoran (disambiguation), several people
 Tommy Corcoran (baseball) (1869–1960), American baseball player
 William Corcoran Eustis (1862–1921), wealthy inhabitant of Washington, D.C. and grandson of William Wilson Corcoran
 William Wilson Corcoran (1798–1888), American banker, philanthropist and art collector

See also 
 Cochrane (surname)
 Corkran (surname)

References 

Anglicised Irish-language surnames